Shaykha Munira Qubaysi (also spelled Qubeysi; 1933 – December 25, 2022) was an Islamic scholar and spiritual guide to a vast number of women around the world who were impacted by her either directly or indirectly through her students.

Education 
Shaykha Munira Qubaysi completed a Bachelor’s degree in biology at the University of Damascus in the 1950s in an era when women in hijab studying at universities was either a rarity or entirely non-existent. Damascus of the 1950s was heavily francophone following the experience of French colonialism which meant that upper class urban families shunned outward religious practice such as hijab, and adopted a lifestyle that emulated European colonial ideals. Religiously conservative urban families on the other hand, commonly adopted another extreme in that they prevented their daughters from studying past the sixth or eighth grades and focused on training their daughters with the household skills that would enable them to marry early. Shaykha Munira was a trailblazer in bypassing these polarized societal norms by becoming a model of how women can have “the best of both worlds” by combining religious piety and practice with acquiring secular education and holding professional jobs.

Shaykha Munira later earned another degree in Islamic studies (shariah) and learned both the outward and inward (Islamic spirituality) sciences of Islam from some of the most renowned scholars of Damascus. She was given the authorization (ijaza) to teach and be a spiritual guide. She established her own independent women's spiritual movement while simultaneously maintaining collaborative connections with the major religious leaders of Syria as a Muslim spiritual leader in her own right. After she died, much of the major male religious figures in Syria and beyond came forward to pay condolences and recognize her work.

Her Students 

Hajjah Duriyya al-Aytah (d.2011)

Shaykha Munira started her work building a strong foundation among a small group of women who would become her inner circle of scholars, teachers, and spiritual guides. Each of them excelled in a particular field of Islamic studies that they would spend the next decades of their lives specializing in until they became leading experts in this field. For example, Hajjah Duriyya al-Ayṭah studied fiqh with the late Damascene scholar ʽAbd al-Karīm al-Rifāʽī who was one of the pre-eminent scholars of Damascus. His decision to counter the exclusion of women from religious learning by teaching a small group of promising women would have a long-term impact that he would not live to see. Hajjah Duriyya studied the core texts of the Shafi’i school of law which included; al-Muqaddima al-ḥaḍramiyya, Sharḥ al-bayjūrī, Sharḥ al-taḥrīr, Mughnī al-muḥtāj, Rawdat al-ṭālibīn , and al-Majmūʽ. She became one of Shaykh ʿAbd al-Karīm’s most exceptional students and was granted authorization (ijaza) to teach.

Hajjah Duriyya followed Shaykha Munira’s vision of formulating a strategy to make classical Islamic knowledge both relevant and accessible to the modern masses who had become disillusioned by traditional Islamic learning and whose world view was shaped by the expansion of the printing press and the decline of the memorization of poems (mutun). She published her book, Fiqh al-Ibadat, that was structured in chapters and subheadings and which followed the flow of modern textbooks. She also explained concepts of fiqh in contemporary prose that made the subject far more accessible to the modern reader. While another contemporary author, Sayyid al-Sabiq, wrote the Fiqh al-Sunna series that addressed the same modern realities by combining the four schools of law arbitrarily into a simplified text, Hajjah Duriyya’s work was distinct in that it maintained the integrity of the Shafi’i school of law in the contents of her book while structuring the way she transmitted these contents in ways that were relevant to modern contexts.

Her book became so popular that it sold out through several editions. Its format was also adapted to each of the other three schools of Islamic law. Students of Shaykha Munira who excelled in Hanafi, Maliki, and Hanbali fiqh each wrote a Fiqh al-ʿIbadāt text that adhered to each of these other schools of fiqh. Women who previously had limited knowledge of Islamic law gained from the precedent of Hajjah Duriyya and the many students she taught who taught many other women and so forth. It is said that when Hajjah Duriyya was prevented from teaching women at a particular mosque in her early days as a scholar, she used her inheritance money to purchase a mosque and build a section attached to it that would be entirely dedicated to women educating women. Her knowledge, humility, charity, and piety made her loved until her death in 2011.

Shaykha Samira Zayid (d. 2019)

Shaykha Samira was a brilliant scholar whose encyclopedic knowledge was astounding and whose spiritual discipline made her both loved and admired. She was one of the right-hand students of Shaykha Munira and one of the leading figures that shaped Shaykha Munira’s movement. She dedicated forty years of her life to the study of the life of the Prophet Muhammad and wrote books that have surpassed those that have been written on the life of the Prophet until her time. Before electronic dictionaries and the internet existed, she sifted through every hadith and historical report related to the life of the Prophet Muhammad and compiled a hefty reference work of several volumes known as al-Jāmīʿ fī sīrat al-nabawiyya. It was ordered both chronologically and topically. Every matn or textual body variant in the body of a report is included under each topic with its chains of transmission (isnāds). Additionally, similar reports found in different hadith or historical compilations are listed in the footnotes of each report.

For example, if one seeks to find the various traditions that narrate the Prophet Muhammad’s migration (hijra) from Mecca to Madina, one would turn to this incident in this reference text. One will then find that all of the different reports with their variations in the body (matns) of the hadiths will be found in one location of Shaykha Samira’s reference work. If one seeks to compare the reliability of the chains of transmission of the variant reports highlighting the migration of the Prophet, they can also do so in the same section of this same work. If one wishes to access the primary source in which the hadith appears, they can do so using the references listed in Shaykha Samira’s text.

Shaykha Samira Zayid understood that her multivolume work consolidating all of the reports on the life of the Prophet Muhammad were useful as references for a select few who have the adequate scholastic training to work with these sources. She supplemented her reference work by compiling another two oversized volumes that abridge the information in her encyclopedic work to offer a sophisticated narrative history of the life of the Prophet in a way that incorporates prose and primary reports that makes the study of the life of the Prophet accessible to an educated audience. While other modern biographies exist, Shaykha Samira’s work offers a level of study that exceeds the introductory level sources that are commonly available while simultaneously using textual formats that facilitate an advanced level of study of the Prophet’s life with rich materials from primary sources.

She later published another work named, Lessons from the Life of the Prophet (Durus min sīrat al-nabawiyya). The three works of Shaykha Samira Zayed combined, form what is arguably the most comprehensive study of the life of the Prophet Muhammad available today. Shaykh Ramadan Buti who wrote an endorsement of her work said, “it is an effort that has surpassed—with thanks to God—those of the men of this era.”

Shaykha Samira, as all of Shaykha Munira’s students, was far more than an outstanding scholar of Islam. She was also a deeply spiritual lover of God who was known to have little sleep and spend much of her nights in prayer. She was also known to fast extensively in her early days with her teacher as an exercise of spiritual discipline. She was regarded with a combination of awe and love by her students who saw in her a rare model of knowledge, spiritual fortitude, and an all-embracing love for the Prophet whose life she dedicated hers to studying and teaching about.  

al-Ḥāfiẓa al-Jāmiʿa'' Dr. Daʿad al-Ḥusaynī  (d. 2009)

Dr. Daʿad, as she was known, was another exceptional student from the inner circle of Shaykha Munira Qubaysi. Her family traced their lineage back to the Prophet Muhammad through Amīr ʿAbd al-Qadir al-Jazāʾirī who is famed for having led the resistance against French colonialism in Algeria. She was a humble yet dignified and noble scholar whose presence inspired awe.

She was born in 1938 to an Algerian father, Muhammad ʿAlī Ḥusaynī al-Jazāʾirī, who was a religious scholar and spiritual guide. Dr. Da’ad started her career by earning a PhD in mathematics from the Soviet Union. She came back and taught for a while in Algeria before marrying a Syrian man and settling in Damascus where she was appointed as a professor of mathematics at the University of Damascus.

Dr. Daʿad’s meeting with Shaykha Munira Qubaysi was a spiritually transformative experience that led her to dedicate her life to studying and teaching the Qur’an to countless women. Dr. Daʿad became one of Shaykha Munira’s closest students with an expertise in the ten recitations of the Qur’an.  She earned an “ijaza” or certificate in the ten canonical recitations of the Qur’an through the scholar of Syria, Shaykh Abū al-Ḥasan al-Kurdī. She was also authorized by him to give the ijaza on his behalf to those women who sought to be connected through the chains of Qur’anic reciters to the Prophet. Dr. Daʿad out of immense courtesy with Shaykh Abū al-Ḥasan rarely used this privilege except out of necessity.

Dr. Daʿad taught the Qur’an to hundreds of women who then received their certifications (ijāzāt) in Qur’anic memorization and/or recitation. These hundreds of women then taught an exponential number of other women and children the Qur’an. An unaccountable number of these women came from dozens of countries around the world to study the Qur’an at the hands of Dr. Daʿad and her students. Many of these students were Americans, the stories of which Ingrid Mattson details in the third chapter of her book, The Story of the Qur’an: Its History and Place in Muslim Life.

One of her university students during the late seventies was Ahmad Moaz al-Khatib who later became the Imam at the Umayyad Mosque for a period of time. When she died he wrote the following words in tribute:“She spent her life as an upright spiritual guide, a devoted wife, a dedicated mother, and a great scholar… Until now, I recall her firm command over a college lecture hall of hundreds of students whose eyes had never been exposed to a woman in a headscarf who was capable of instructing them in mathematics (keeping in mind that she was one of the rare women in the universities at that time who practiced Islam to this level).  I can also testify with all honesty that she was one of the most proficient professors with whom I had studied mathematics and to this day, I possess in my heart the greatest of respect and gratitude towards her.While she published only a small booklet on the science of tajwīd, she engraved the Book of God on the hearts of thousands of our mothers, sisters, and daughters.  She also published books on mathematics, problem solving, and numbers.  She possessed the most lofty of good character, exceeding benevolence and had a luminous smile that encompassed both resolution and kindheartedness.”''

Her Impact 
The numerous students which Shaykha Munira Qubaysi spiritually mentored eventually became renowned scholars, spiritual guides, and religious leaders in their own right. The names mentioned above are only a few of the most famous of her students. Many others focused solely on the spiritual upbringing of women and maintained a greater level of privacy. 

Shayka Munira realized that to succeed in her mission to revive faith and practice in society, it was essential for women to have their own sources of income. She established a network of schools that would eventually spread far beyond her homeland. These schools served a number of purposes: 

1) They ensured that spiritual guides, teachers, and preachers which she trained could avoid the conflicts of interest and changes of heart that commonly arise when religious leaders are financially dependent upon their religious congregations. All of Shaykha Munira's students did their religious work in communities free of charge. This was an essential principle of Shaykha Munira's way. Religious gatherings, Qur'an lessons, and religious circles (halaqat) were always conducted by her students for free and without personal gain. Her students would designate a part of their days for income generating jobs, household duties, and free of charge religious work that was regarded as a service to their communities.    

2) The presence of Shaykha Munira's schools became a lifeline for thousands of unmarried women who now had the opportunity for gainful employment in a dignified setting. The capacity to support one's self and do so in an environment that was acceptable to the cultural norms of conservative Syrian society, opened doors for women in ways that they could have never imagined before the 1970s. Working in schools run by women teaching children also became an acceptable form of work for married women who desired to contribute to society outside of their homes. 

3) Shaykha Munira's schools served as an endowment for her movement. She was able to use a portion of the profits to give in charity, support orphans, help those in need, and consistently do the work she needed to do without depending on community donations. 

4) Shaykha Munira's schools transformed a generation of young boys who attended her schools and saw in their female teachers a model of piety, wisdom, kindness, education, and accomplishment. Over the decades of Shaykha Munira's seventy years of working, she created a cultural shift in young boys who grew into men who would respect their wives, daughters, sisters, and mothers. Similarly, girls who attended Shaykha Munira's schools grew up seeing strong women who were both educated and devout. The ability to have women's leadership as a part of one's religious formation as a young girl had an immensely consequential impact on the development of the confidence and connection to faith that these girls felt when they grew up. Shaykha Munira's students also exhibited a great deal of joyful creativity in the way that they taught Islam and the Qur'an to children. This made generations of youth who grew up learning their faith in this way associate the Qur'an with fun, treats, singing, and field trips. 

The impact of Shaykha Munira's schools, hospitals, and other institutions she built that were run by her female students must also be considered within the context of modern Syria in which modern education until her time was almost entirely run by foreign missionary women living in Syria. The establishment of institutions that provided an alternative to missionary schools and hospitals had an indelible effect on changing the culture of Syria's urban centers that had been heavily molded by the emulation of the French who had colonized Syria. Her schools countered this trend by giving the parents of children of Damascenes indigenously based schooling options that would nurture Syrian Muslim identities in children. 

Shaykha Munira's fame spread to women around the world starting in the 1990s. Women came in droves from dozens of countries to learn from Shaykha Munira's students who had become scholars and spiritual mentors in their own right. Thousands and thousands of women learned the Qur'an through Shaykha Munira's students and later went to their home countries to teach hundreds of other women who would also teach others. This exponential impact of Shaykha Munira Qubaysi's work has made her one of the most formative Islamic leaders who shaped Islamic practice in the twentieth century. 

Some have labeled Shaykha Munira's students using her name. She has, however, consistently rejected this gendered label saying that her movement was nothing more than a reflection of centuries of mainstream Islamic scholarship and piety. She refused to have her religious work centered around her personality and there is also no evidence of her students self-identifying with this name.   

During her life, she was named the 24th most influential Muslim in the world, and was also named the most influential Muslim woman, according to the Royal Islamic Strategic Studies Centre in 2011.

Munira Qubaysi's movement focuses on learning classical Islamic sciences such as Quran, Hadith, Islamic History, Fiqh (Islamic Law), Life of the Prophet Muhammad (Sira), Qur'anic exegesis, and Islamic Spirituality (Sufism). It is the largest women-only Islamic movement in the world, and offers Islamic education exclusively to girls and women. Shaykha Munira Qubaysi is said to have directed about 80 schools in Damascus alone.

Shaykha Munira Qubaysi died on December 25, 2022, at the age of 89.

References

General references

External links
 Qubaysi
 Islamic Revival in Syria Is Led by Women, New York Times

1933 births
2022 deaths
Islam in Syria
Syrian Sufis
Syrian women
Syrian Muslim scholars of Islam
Women scholars of Islam
Female Islamic religious leaders